Potassium ferricyanide is the chemical compound with the formula K3[Fe(CN)6]. This bright red salt contains the octahedrally coordinated [Fe(CN)6]3− ion. It is soluble in water and its solution shows some green-yellow fluorescence. It was discovered in 1822 by Leopold Gmelin.

Preparation
Potassium ferricyanide is manufactured by passing chlorine through a solution of potassium ferrocyanide. Potassium ferricyanide separates from the solution:
2 K4[Fe(CN)6] + Cl2 → 2 K3[Fe(CN)6] + 2 KCl

Structure
Like other metal cyanides, solid potassium ferricyanide has a complicated polymeric structure.  The polymer consists of octahedral [Fe(CN)6]3− centers crosslinked with K+ ions that are bound to the CN ligands.  The K+---NCFe linkages break when the solid is dissolved in water.

Applications
The compound is also used to harden iron and steel, in electroplating, dyeing wool, as a laboratory reagent, and as a mild oxidizing agent in organic chemistry.

Photography

Blueprint, cyanotype, toner 
The compound has widespread use in blueprint drawing and in photography (Cyanotype process). Several photographic print toning processes involve the use of potassium ferricyanide.

Bleaching 
Potassium ferricyanide was used as an oxidizing agent to remove silver from color negatives and positives during processing, a process called bleaching. Because potassium ferricyanide bleaches are environmentally unfriendly, short-lived, and capable of releasing hydrogen cyanide gas if mixed with high concentrations and volumes of acid, bleaches using ferric EDTA have been used in color processing since the 1972 introduction of the Kodak C-41 process. In color lithography, potassium ferricyanide is used to reduce the size of color dots without reducing their number, as a kind of manual color correction called dot etching.

Farmers Reducer  
Ferricyanide is also used in black-and-white photography with sodium thiosulfate (hypo) to reduce the density of a negative or gelatin silver print where the mixture is known as Farmer's reducer; this can help offset problems from overexposure of the negative, or brighten the highlights in the print.

Reagent in organic synthesis
Potassium ferricyanide is a used as an oxidant in organic chemistry.  It is an oxidant for catalyst regeneration in Sharpless dihydroxylations.

Sensors and indicators
Potassium ferricyanide is also one of two compounds present in ferroxyl indicator solution (along with phenolphthalein) that turns blue (Prussian blue) in the presence of Fe2+ ions, and which can therefore be used to detect metal oxidation that will lead to rust. It is possible to calculate the number of moles of Fe2+ ions by using a colorimeter, because of the very intense color of Prussian blue.

In physiology experiments potassium ferricyanide provides a means increasing a solution's redox potential (E°' ~ 436 mV at pH 7). As such, it can oxidize reduced cytochrome c (E°' ~ 247 mV at pH 7) in isolated mitochondria. Sodium dithionite is usually used as a reducing chemical in such experiments (E°' ~ −420 mV at pH 7).

Potassum ferricyanide is used to determine the ferric reducing power potential of a sample (extract, chemical compound, etc.). Such a measurement is used to determine of the antioxidant property of a sample.

Potassium ferricyanide is a component of amperometric biosensors as an electron transfer agent replacing an enzyme's natural electron transfer agent such as oxygen as with the enzyme glucose oxidase. It is an ingredient in commercially available blood glucose meters for use by diabetics.

Other
Potassium ferricyanide is combined with potassium hydroxide (or sodium hydroxide as a substitute) and water to formulate Murakami's etchant. This etchant is used by metallographers to provide contrast between binder and carbide phases in cemented carbides.

Prussian blue
Prussian blue, the deep blue pigment in blue printing, is generated by the reaction of K3[Fe(CN)6] with ferrous (Fe2+) ions as well as K4[Fe(CN)6] with ferric salts.

In histology, potassium ferricyanide is used to detect ferrous iron in biological tissue. Potassium ferricyanide reacts with ferrous iron in acidic solution to produce the insoluble blue pigment, commonly referred to as Turnbull's blue or Prussian blue. To detect ferric (Fe3+) iron, potassium ferrocyanide is used instead in the Perls' Prussian blue staining method. The material formed in the Turnbull's blue reaction and the compound formed in the Prussian blue reaction are the same.

Safety
Potassium ferricyanide has low toxicity, its main hazard being that it is a mild irritant to the eyes and skin. However, under very strongly acidic conditions, highly toxic hydrogen cyanide gas is evolved, according to the equation:

6 H+ + [Fe(CN)6]3− → 6 HCN + Fe3+

See also
Ferricyanide
Ferrocyanide
Potassium ferrocyanide

References

External links
International Chemical Safety Card 1132
 National Pollutant Inventory – Cyanide compounds fact sheet

Potassium compounds
Iron(III) compounds
Cyano complexes
Iron complexes
Photographic chemicals
Oxidizing agents